Secdrick McIntyre (born June 2, 1954) is a former American football running back. He played for the Atlanta Falcons in 1977.

References

1954 births
Living people
American football running backs
Auburn Tigers football players
Atlanta Falcons players